Brian Agler (born August 2, 1958) is an American women's professional basketball coach. He previously coached the Dallas Wings from 2019 to 2020. He also had previously been head coach of the Seattle Storm and the Los Angeles Sparks, each of whom he led to a championship in 2010 and 2016 respectively. During his coaching career, Agler has guided young stars like Candace Parker, Nneka Ogwumike, Alana Beard, Skylar Diggins-Smith, Tayler Hill, Liz Cambage, Megan Gustafson, and Arike Ogunbowale.

Early years
Agler attended college at Wittenberg University in Ohio, where he cheered on the Tigers win the 1977 Division III NCAA Championship as a point guard. He graduated in 1980. He received his master's degree in education from Pittsburg State University in 1985.

Coaching career

College

Kansas State
Agler became the head coach of the Kansas State women's basketball team in 1993. He was suspended in the middle of his third season (1995–1996), pending an NCAA rules violation investigation. Kansas State under Agler was 13–14 his first season (1993–1994), 14–13 his second season, and 11–12 for the 23 games he coached in his final season.

American Basketball League (ABL)

Columbus Quest
As head coach of the Columbus Quest of the American Basketball League, Agler led the team to a combined 82–22 record and two ABL Championships. He was named ABL Coach of the Year in 1997.

Women's National Basketball Association (WNBA)

Minnesota Lynx
After the ABL collapsed in late 1998, Agler made the shift to the WNBA. He became the first head coach of the Minnesota Lynx, piloting them to a 48–67 record from 1999–2002.

Assistant coaching stints
He served as an assistant coach with the Phoenix Mercury in the 2004 season, then with the San Antonio Silver Stars from 2005 to 2007.

Seattle Storm
The Seattle Storm named Agler head coach on January 9, 2008. He succeeded Anne Donovan. who resigned in November 2007.  Agler was the general manager and head coach for the Seattle Storm until 2014, leading them to their second championship in 2010.

Los Angeles Sparks
On January 5, 2015, it was announced that Agler would become the head coach of the Los Angeles Sparks.

Agler guided the 2015 version of the Sparks to a 14–20 record and a 4th-place finish in the WNBA's Western Conference.

On October 20, 2016, Agler guided the Sparks to their third WNBA championship, defeating the Lynx, 77–76, in the decisive Game 5 of the 2016 WNBA Finals, thereby winning the league championship series, 3–2. He became the first head coach to win WNBA titles with two teams.

On November 1, 2018, Agler resigned from his position as the Sparks coach.

Dallas Wings
On December 17, 2018, Agler was hired as the head coach of the Dallas Wings.

On October 14, 2020, the Dallas Wings announced that the organization had parted ways with Agler.

Coaching record

|-
| align="left" | MIN
| align="left" |1999
|32||15||17|||| align="center" |4th in West||-||-||-||-
| align="center" |Missed Playoffs
|-
| align="left" |MIN
| align="left" |2000
|32||15||17|||| align="center" |6th in West||-||-||-||-
| align="center" |Missed Playoffs
|- 
| align="left" |MIN
| align="left" |2001
|32||12||20|||| align="center" |6th in West||-||-||-||-
| align="center" |Missed Playoffs
|- 
| align="left" |MIN
| align="left" |2002
|19||6||13|||| align="center" |8th in West||-||-||-||-
| align="center" |Fired Mid-Season
|-
| align="left" |SEA
| align="left" |2008
|34||22||12|||| align="center" |2nd in West||3||1||2||
| align="center" |Lost in Western Conference Semi-Finals
|-
| align="left" |SEA
| align="left" |2009
|34||20||14|||| align="center" |2nd in West||3||1||2||
| align="center" |Lost in Western Conference Semi-Finals
|- ! style="background:#FDE910;"
| align="left" |SEA
| align="left" |2010
|34||28||6|||| align="center" |1st in West||7||7||0||
| align="center" |Won WNBA Finals
|-
| align="left" |SEA
| align="left" |2011
|34||21||13|||| align="center" |2nd in West||3||1||2||
| align="center" |Lost in Western Conference Semi-Finals
|- 
| align="left" |SEA
| align="left" |2012
|34||16||18|||| align="center" |4th in West||3||1||2||
| align="center" |Lost in Western Conference Semi-Finals
|-
| align="left" | SEA
| align="left" |2013
|34||17||17|||| align="center" |4th in West||2||0||2||
| align="center" |Lost in Western Conference Semi-Finals
|-
| align="left" | SEA
| align="left" |2014
|34||12||22|||| align="center" |5th in West||-||-||-||-
| align="center" |Missed Playoffs
|-
| align="left" | LA
| align="left" |2015
|34||14||20|||| align="center" |4th in West||3||1||2||
| align="center" |Lost in Western Conference Semi-Finals
|- ! style="background:#FDE910;"
| align="left" | LA
| align="left" |2016
|34||26||8|||| align="center" |2nd in West||9||6||3||
| align="center" |Won WNBA Finals
|-
| align="left" | LA
| align="left" |2017
|34||26||8|||| align="center" |2nd in West||8||5||3||
| align="center" |Lost in WNBA Finals
|-
| align="left" | LA
| align="left" |2018
|34||19||15|||| align="center" |3rd in West||2||1||1||
| align="center" |Lost in Western Conference Semi-Finals
|-
| align="left" | DAL
| align="left" |2019
|34||10||24|||| align="center" |5th in West||-||-||-||-
| align="center" |Missed Playoffs
|-
| align="left" | DAL
| align="left" |2020
|22||8||14|||| align="center" |6th in West||-||-||-||-
| align="center" |Missed Playoffs
|-class="sortbottom"
| align="left" |Career
| ||545||287||258|||| ||43||24||19||

Personal life
He now lives in Ohio. Is now Athletic Director at his alma mater Wittenberg University. Where he forced long time football coach Joe Fincham to resign after 25 years at the school. Brian stated it was his decision 

Agler's son, Bryce, was an assistant coach with the Los Angeles Sparks during Agler's tenure as head coach of the franchise.

References

External links
 Brian Agler named head coach of the Seattle Storm

1958 births
Living people
American Basketball League (1996–1998) coaches
American men's basketball players
Basketball coaches from Ohio
Basketball players from Ohio
Kansas State Wildcats women's basketball coaches
Los Angeles Sparks head coaches
Minnesota Lynx head coaches
Phoenix Mercury coaches
Point guards
San Antonio Stars coaches
Seattle Storm coaches
University of Pittsburgh alumni
Wittenberg Tigers men's basketball players
Women's National Basketball Association championship-winning head coaches
Women's National Basketball Association executives
Women's National Basketball Association general managers
Kansas City Roos women's basketball coaches